The Linux Foundation (LF) is a non-profit technology consortium founded in 2000 as a merger between Open Source Development Labs and the Free Standards Group to standardize Linux, support its growth, and promote its commercial adoption. Additionally, it hosts and promotes the collaborative development of open source software projects.

The foundation was launched in 2000, under the Open Source Development Labs (OSDL) and became the organization it is today when OSDL merged with the Free Standards Group (FSG). The Linux Foundation sponsors the work of Linux creator Linus Torvalds and lead maintainer Greg Kroah-Hartman. Furthermore, it is supported by members, such as AT&T, Cisco, Fujitsu, Google, Hitachi, Huawei, IBM, Intel, Meta, Microsoft, NEC, Oracle, Orange S.A., Qualcomm, Samsung, Tencent, and VMware, as well as developers from around the world.

In recent years, the Linux Foundation has expanded its support programs through events, training and certification, as well as open source projects. Projects hosted at the Linux Foundation include the Linux kernel project, Kubernetes, Automotive Grade Linux, ONAP (Open Network Automation Platform), Hyperledger, Cloud Native Computing Foundation, Cloud Foundry Foundation, Xen project, and many others.

Goals 
The Linux Foundation is dedicated to building sustainable ecosystems around open source projects to accelerate technology development and commercial adoption. The foundation currently sponsors the work of Linux creator Linus Torvalds and lead maintainer Greg Kroah-Hartman, and aims to provide a neutral home where Linux kernel development can be protected and accelerated.

The foundation also hosts collaborative events among the Linux technical community, software developers, industries, and end users to solve pressing issues facing Linux and open source.

The Linux Foundation supports the Free software movement by offering technical information and education through its annual events, such as Open Source Leadership Summit, Linux Kernel Developers Summit and Open Source Summit. A developer travel fund is available.

Initiatives

Community Data License Agreement (CDLA) 

Introduced in October 2017, the Community Data License Agreement (CDLA) is a legal framework for sharing data. There are two initial CDLA licenses:
 The CDLA-Sharing license was designed to embody the principles of copyleft in a data license. It puts terms in place to ensure that downstream recipients can use and modify that data, and are also required to share their changes to the data.
 The CDLA-Permissive agreement is similar to permissive open source licenses in that the publisher of data allows anyone to use, modify and do what they want with the data with no obligations to share changes or modifications.

Linux.com 

On March 3, 2009, the Linux Foundation announced that they would take over the management of Linux.com from its previous owners, SourceForge, Inc.

The site was relaunched on May 13, 2009, shifting away from its previous incarnation as a news site to become a central source for Linux tutorials, information, software, documentation and answers across the server, desktop/netbook, mobile, and embedded areas. It also includes a directory of Linux software and hardware.

Much like Linux itself, Linux.com plans to rely on the community to create and drive the content and conversation.

Linux Foundation Public Health (LFPH) 
In 2020 amidst the COVID-19 pandemic, the Linux Foundation announced the LFPH, a program dedicated to advancing and supporting the virus contact tracing work led by Google and Apple and their Bluetooth notification systems. The LFPH is focusing its efforts on public health applications, including the effort's first initiative: a notification app intended for governments wanting to launch their privacy-focused exposure notification networks. As of today, LFPH hosts two contact-tracing apps.

LF Climate Finance Foundation 
In September 2020, The Linux Foundation announced the LF Climate Finance Foundation (LFCF), a new initiative "to encourage investment in AI-enhanced open source analytics to address climate change." LFCF plans to build a platform that will utilize open-source open data to help the financial investment, NGO, and academia sectors to help better model companies’ exposure to climate change. Allianz, Amazon, Microsoft, and S&P Global will be the initiative's founding members.

LF Energy 

LF Energy is an initiative launched by the Linux Foundation in 2018 to improve the power grid.

Training and certification 

The Linux Foundation Training Program features instructors and content from the leaders of the Linux developer and open source communities.

Participants receive Linux training that is vendor-neutral and created with oversight from leaders of the Linux development community. The Linux Foundation's online and in-person training programs aim to deliver broad, foundational knowledge and networking opportunities.

In March 2014, the Linux Foundation and edX partnered to offer a free massive open online class titled Introduction to Linux. This was the first in a series of ongoing free offerings from both organizations whose current catalogue of MOOCs include Intro to DevOps, Intro to Cloud Foundry and Cloud Native Software Architecture, Intro to Apache Hadoop, Intro to Cloud Infrastructure Technologies, and Intro to OpenStack.

In December 2015, the Linux Foundation introduced a self-paced course designed to help prepare administrators for the OpenStack Foundation's Certified OpenStack Administrator exam.

As part of a partnership with Microsoft, it was announced in December 2015 that the Linux on Azure certification would be awarded to individuals who pass both the Microsoft Exam 70-533 (Implementing Microsoft Azure Infrastructure Solutions) and the Linux Foundation Certified System Administrator (LFCS) exam.

In early 2017, at the annual Open Source Leadership Summit, it was announced that the Linux Foundation would begin offering an Inclusive Speaker Orientation course in partnership with the National Center for Women & Information Technology. The free course is designed to give participants "practical skills to promote inclusivity in their presentations."

In September 2020, the Linux Foundation released a free serverless computing training course with CNCF. It is taught by Alex Ellis, founder of OpenFaaS.

Among many other organization with similar offerings, The Linux Foundation has reported a 40% increase in demand for their online courses in 2020 during the coronavirus pandemic and the resulting social-distancing measures.

Patent Commons Project 
The patent commons consists of all patented software which has been made available to the open source community. For software to be considered to be in the commons the patent owner must guarantee that developers will not be sued for infringement, though there may be some restrictions on the use of the patented code. The concept was first given substance by Red Hat in 2001 when it published its Patent Promise.

The Patent Commons Project was launched on November 15, 2005, by the Open Source Development Labs (OSDL). The core of the project is an online patent commons reference library aggregating and documenting information about patent-related pledges and other legal solutions directed at the open-source software community. , the project listed 53 patents.

Projects 

Linux Foundation Projects (originally "Collaborative Projects") are independently funded software projects that harness the power of collaborative development to fuel innovation across industries and ecosystems. More than 500 companies and thousands of developers from around the world contribute to these open source software projects.

, the total lines of source code present in Linux Foundation's Collaborative Projects are 115,013,302. The estimated, total amount of effort required to retrace the steps of collaborative development for these projects is 41,192.25 person years. In other words, it would take 1,356 developers 30 years to recreate the code bases. At that time, the total economic value of development costs of Linux Foundation Collaborative Projects was estimated at $5 billion. Through continued investment in open source projects and growth in the number of projects hosted, this number rose to $15.6 billion by September 2017.

All Linux Foundation projects are covered by the Contributor Covenant code of conduct developed by Coraline Ada Ehmke, which is intended to ensure a safe and harassment-free environment for minorities.

Some of the projects include (alphabetical order):

ACRN 
ACRN is a flexible, lightweight reference hypervisor, built with real-time and safety-criticality in mind, optimized to streamline embedded development through an open source platform.

AllJoyn 
AllJoyn is an open source application framework for connected devices and services was formed under Allseen Alliance in 2013. The project is now sponsored as an independent Linux Foundation project by the Open Connectivity Foundation (OCF).

Automotive Grade Linux 

Automotive Grade Linux (AGL) is a collaborative open source project developing a Linux-based, open platform for the connected car that can serve as the de facto standard for the industry. Although initially focused on In-Vehicle Infotainment (IVI), the AGL roadmap includes instrument cluster, heads up display, telematics and autonomous driving. The goals of AGL are to provide:
 An automotive-focused core Linux operating system stack that meets common and shared requirements of the automotive ecosystem
 A transparent, collaborative and open environment for Automotive OEMs, Tier One suppliers, and their semiconductor and software vendors to create in-vehicle software
 A collective voice for working with other open source projects and developing new open source solutions
 An embedded Linux distribution that enables rapid prototyping for developers new to Linux or teams with prior open source experience

AGL technology 
On June 30, 2014, AGL announced their first release, which was based on Tizen IVI and was primarily for demo applications. AGL expanded the first reference platform with the Unified Code Base (UCB) distribution. The first UCB release, nicknamed Agile Albacore, was released in January 2016 and leverages software components from AGL, Tizen and GENIVI Alliance, now called COVESA (Connected Vehicle Systems Alliance). UCB 2.0, nicknamed Brilliant Blowfish, was made available in July 2016 and included new features like rear seat display, video playback, audio routing and application framework. UCB 3.0, or Charming Chinook was released in January 2017. AGL plans to support additional use cases such as instrument clusters and telematics systems.

Carrier Grade Linux 

The "CGL" Workgroup's main purpose is to "interface with network equipment providers and carriers to gather requirements and produce specifications that Linux distribution vendors can implement." It also serves to use unimplemented requirements to foster development projects that will assist in the upstream integration of these requirements.

CD Foundation 
The Continuous Delivery Foundation serves as the vendor-neutral home of many of the fastest-growing projects for continuous delivery, including Jenkins, Jenkins X, Spinnaker, and Tekton. It supports DevOps practitioners with an open model, training, industry guidelines, and a portability focus.

Cloud Foundry 
Cloud Foundry is an open source, multi cloud application platform as a service (PaaS) governed by the Cloud Foundry Foundation, a 501(c)(6) organization. In January 2015, the Cloud Foundry Foundation was created as an independent not-for-profit Linux Foundation Project. The foundation exists to increase awareness and adoption of Cloud Foundry, grow the contributor community, and create a cohesive strategy across all member companies. The Foundation serves as a neutral party holding all Cloud Foundry intellectual property.

Cloud Native Computing Foundation 

Founded in 2015, the Cloud Native Computing Foundation (CNCF) exists to help advance container technology and align the tech industry around its evolution. It was announced with Kubernetes 1.0, an open source container cluster manager, which was contributed to the foundation by Google as a seed technology. Today, CNCF is backed by over 450 sponsors. Founding members include Google, CoreOS, Mesosphere, Red Hat, Twitter, Huawei, Intel, Cisco, IBM, Docker, Univa, and VMware.

CHAOSS 
The Community Health Analytics Open Source Software (CHAOSS) project was announced at the 2017 Open Source Summit North America in Los Angeles. Overall, the project aims to provide transparency and health and security metrics for open-source projects.

Code Aurora Forum 
Code Aurora Forum is a consortium of companies with projects serving the mobile wireless industry. Software projects it concerns itself with are e.g. Android for MSM, Femto Linux Project, LLVM, MSM WLAN and Linux-MSM.

Core Embedded Linux Project 
Started in 2003, the Core Embedded Linux Project aims to provide a vendor-neutral place to establish core embedded Linux technologies beyond those of the Linux Foundation's Projects. From the start, any Linux Foundation member company has been allowed to apply for membership in the Core Embedded Linux Project.

Core Infrastructure Initiative 

The Core Infrastructure Initiative was announced on 25 April 2014 in the wake of Heartbleed to fund and support free and open-source software projects that are critical to the functioning of the Internet.

Delta Lake 
Delta Lake is an open-source storage layer that brings ACID transactions to Apache Spark and big data workloads.

DiaMon Workgroup 
The DiaMon Workgroup works toward improving interoperability between open source tools and improve Linux-based tracing, profiling, logging, and monitoring features. According to the workgroup, DiaMon "aims to accelerate this development by making it easier to work together on common pieces."

DPDK 
The Data Plane Development Kit consists of libraries to accelerate CPU architecture-running packet processing workloads. According to Intel, "DPDK can improve packet processing performance by up to ten times."

Dronecode 
Started in 2014, Dronecode began as an open source, collaborative project to unite current and future open source drone initiatives under the auspices of the Linux Foundation. The goal is a common, shared open source stack for Unmanned Aerial Vehicles (UAVs). Chris Anderson (CEO of 3D Robotics & founder of DIY Drones) serves as the chairman of the board of directors. Lorenz Meier, creator of PX4, MAVLink, QGC, and Pixhawk serves as the community representative on the Board.

EdgeX Foundry 
Founded in 2017, EdgeX Foundry acts as a vendor-neutral interoperability framework. It is hosted in a hardware and OS agnostic reference platform and seeks to enable an ecosystem of plug-and-play components, uniting the marketplace and accelerating IoT deployment. The project wants to enable collaborators to freely work on open and interoperable IoT solutions with existing and self-created connectivity standards.

ELISA 
The ELISA (Enabling Linux In Safety Applications) project was started to make it easier for companies to build and certify Linux kernel-based safety-critical applications – systems whose failure could result in loss of human life, significant property damage or environmental damage. ELISA members are working together to define and maintain a common set of tools and processes that can help companies demonstrate that a Linux-based system meets the necessary safety requirements for certification.

ELISA was launched in 2019 and builds upon work done by SIL2LinuxMP and Real-Time Linux projects.

FD.io 
The Fast Data Project-referred to as "Fido"- provides an IO services framework for the next wave of network and storage software. In the stack, FD.io is the universal data plane. "FD.io runs completely in the user space," said Ed Warnicke (consulting engineer with Cisco and chair of the FD.io technical steering committee).

FinOps Foundation 
The FinOps Foundation supports practitioners of FinOps, a discipline that helps finance and IT operations teams to work together to manage public cloud spending collaboratively, to get the maximum value out of cloud investments in a way that aligns to organizational goals. FinOps principles, best practices and framework allow for more accountability and predictability to the highly variable, self-service, consumption based billing models of public cloud.

FOSSology 
FOSSology is primarily a project dedicated to an open source license compliance software system and toolkit. Users are able to run license, copyright and export control scans from the command line. A database and web UI provide a compliance workflow.

FRRouting 
FRRouting (FRR) is an IP routing protocol suite for Unix and Linux platforms. It incorporates protocol daemons for BGP, IS-IS, LDP, OSPF, PIM, and RIP.

GraphQL Foundation 

On 7 November 2018, the GraphQL project was moved from Facebook to the newly established GraphQL Foundation, hosted by the non-profit Linux Foundation.

Hyperledger 
The Hyperledger project is a global, open source effort based around advancing cross-industry blockchain technologies. In addition to being hosted by the Linux Foundation, it is backed by finance, banking, IoT, supply chain, manufacturing and technology leaders. The project is the foundation's fastest growing to date, boasting over 115 members since founding in 2016. In May 2016, co-founder of the Apache Software Foundation, Brian Behlendorf, joined the project as its executive director.

Inclusive Naming Initiative Fund 
To prevent offense to minorities and otherwise marginalized individuals, the Inclusive Naming Initiative helps projects and companies make consistent, responsible choices to remove harmful language from open source code and documentation. Such harmful language may include the use of terms such as Master/slave (technology) and Blacklist (computing). The initiative has already achieved considerable success in removing such terminology from open source software including the Linux kernel.

IO Visor 
IO Visor is an open source project and community of developers that will enable a new way to innovate, develop and share IO and networking functions. It will advance IO and networking technologies to address new requirements presented by cloud computing, the Internet of Things (IoT), Software-Defined Networking (SDN) and Network Function Virtualization (NFV).

IoTivity 
IoTivity is an OSS framework enabling seamless device-to-device connectivity to aid the Internet of Things as it grows. While Allseen Alliance and Open Connectivity Foundation merged in October 2016, the IoT projects of each (AllJoyn and IoTivity, respectively) will continue operating under The Linux Foundation. The two projects will "collaborate to support future versions of the OCF specification with a single IoTivity implementation."

JanusGraph 

JanusGraph aims to continue open source development of the TitanDB graph database. It is a fork TitanDB, "the distributed graph database that was originally released in 2012 to enable users to find connections among large data sets composed of billions of vertices and edges."

JS Foundation 

JS Foundation existed from 2016 to 2019. It was created in 2016 when the Dojo Foundation merged with jQuery Foundation, which merged subsequently rebranded itself as JS Foundation and became a Linux Foundation project. In 2019, the JS Foundation merged with the Node.js Foundation to form the new OpenJS Foundation with a stated mission to foster healthy growth of the JavaScript and web ecosystem as a whole.

Kinetic Open Storage Project 
The Kinetic Open Storage Project is dedicated to creating an open source standard around Ethernet-enabled, key/value Kinetic devices for accessing their drives. By creating this standard, it expands the available ecosystem of software, hardware, and systems developers. The project is the result of an alliance including major hard drive manufacturers - Seagate, Toshiba and Western Digital - in addition to Cisco, Cleversafe, Dell, DigitalSense, NetApp, Open vStorage, Red Hat and Scality.

Linux Standard Base 
The Linux Standard Base, or LSB, is a joint project by several Linux distributions under the organizational structure of the Linux Foundation to standardize the software system structure, or filesystem hierarchy, used with Linux operating system. The LSB is based on the POSIX specification, the Single UNIX Specification, and several other open standards, but extends them in certain areas.

According to the LSB:

The LSB compliance may be certified for a product by a certification procedure.

The LSB specifies for example: standard libraries, a number of commands and utilities that extend the POSIX standard, the layout of the file system hierarchy, run levels, the printing system, including spoolers such as CUPS and tools like Foomatic and several extensions to the X Window System.

Long Term Support Initiative 
LTSI is a project created/supported by Hitachi, LG Electronics, NEC, Panasonic, Qualcomm Atheros, Renesas Electronics, Samsung Electronics, Sony and Toshiba, hosted at The Linux Foundation. It aims to maintain a common Linux base for use in a variety of consumer electronics products.

MLflow 
MLflow is an open source platform to manage the ML lifecycle, including experimentation, reproducibility, deployment, and a central model registry.

Node.js Foundation 

The Node.js Foundation existed from 2015 to 2019. In 2019, the Node.js Foundation merged with the JS Foundation to form the new OpenJS Foundation. with a stated mission to foster healthy growth of the JavaScript and web ecosystem as a whole.

ODPi 
ODPi (Open Data Platform initiative) hosts open source projects that accelerate the development and delivery of big data solutions. It aims to deliver well-defined open source and open data technologies that run across distributed devices. It promotes these technologies worldwide through certification programs and other forms of marketing.

ONOS 

ONOS (Open Network Operating System) is an open source community with a mission of bringing the promise of software-defined networking (SDN) to communications service providers in order to make networks more agile for mobile and data center applications with better economics for both users and providers.

OpenAPI Initiative (OAI) 
OAI is committed to standardizing how REST APIs are described. SmartBear Software has donated the Swagger Specification directly to the initiative. The new name for the specification is OpenAPI Specification.

OpenBMC 
The OpenBMC project is a collaborative open-source project whose goal is to produce an open source implementation of the Baseboard Management Controllers (BMC) Firmware Stack.

OpenChain 

The OpenChain Project aims to define effective open source software compliance in software supply chains. A key output is a reference specification for "good" open source compliance, which has become the ISO/IEC 5230 standard. Another output is a simple self-certification scheme that companies can submit to test their conformance with the standard.

Open Container Initiative 
In 2015, Docker & CoreOS launched the Open Container Initiative in partnership with The Linux Foundation to create a set of industry standards in the open around container formats and runtime.

OpenDaylight 

OpenDaylight is the leading open SDN platform, which aims to accelerate the adoption of Software-Defined Networking (SDN) and Network Functions Virtualization (NFV) in service provider, enterprise and research networks.

OpenJS Foundation 

The OpenJS Foundation is made up of 29 open source JavaScript projects including Appium, Dojo, jQuery, and Node.js, and webpack. Founding members included Google, Microsoft, IBM, PayPal, GoDaddy, and Joyent. It was founded in 2019 from a merger of JS Foundation and Node.js Foundation. Its stated mission is to foster healthy growth of the JavaScript and web ecosystem by providing a neutral organization to host projects and collaboratively fund activities that benefit the ecosystem as a whole.

Open Mainframe Project 

The Open Mainframe Project aims to drive harmony across the mainframe community and to developed shared tool sets and resources. The project also endeavors to heighten participation of academic institutions in educating mainframe Linux engineers and developers.

OpenMAMA 
OpenMAMA (Open Middleware Agnostic Messaging API) is a lightweight vendor-neutral integration layer for systems built on top of a variety of message-oriented middleware.

OpenMessaging 
Announced in October 2017, the goal of OpenMessaging is to act as a vendor-neutral open standard for distributed messaging/stream. The project is supported by Alibaba, Verizon's Oath business unit, and others.

Open Metaverse Foundation 
The Open Metaverse Foundation (OMF) was established in order to discuss and promote standards for an open, vendor-neutral Metaverse. The Foundation is currently divided in multiple Foundational Interest Groups (FIGs) which is composed of members from specific disciplines with a common purpose of advancing the work and technologies within that specific FIG.

OpenPrinting 

The OpenPrinting workgroup is a website belonging to the Linux Foundation which provides documentation and software support for printing under Linux. Formed as LinuxPrinting.org, in 2006 it became part of the Free Standards Group.

They developed a database that lists a wide variety of printers from various manufacturers. The database allows people to give a report on the support and quality of each printer, and they also give a report on the support given to Linux by each printer vendor. They have also created a foomatic (formerly cupsomatic) script which plugs into the Common Unix Printing System (CUPS).

OpenSDS 
OpenSDS is an open source software defined storage controller. As journalist Swapnil Bhartiya explained for CIO, it was formed to create "an industry response to address software-defined storage integration challenges with the goal of driving enterprise adoption of open standards." It is supported by storage users/vendors, including Dell, Huawei, Fujitsu, HDS, Vodafone and Oregon State University.

Open vSwitch 
Originally created at Nicira before moving to VMware (and eventually the Linux Foundation), OvS is an open source virtual switch supporting standard management interfaces and protocols.

ONAP 
The Open Network Automation Platform is the result of OPEN-O and Open ECOMP projects merging in April 2017. The platform allows end users to design, manage, and automate services and virtual functions.

OPNFV 
The Open Platform for Network Function Virtualization (NFV) "aims to be a carrier-grade, integrated platform that introduces new products and services to the industry more quickly." In 2016, the project began an internship program, created a working group and an "End User Advisory Group" (founded by users & the board)

Overture Maps Foundation 
In mid-December 2022, the foundation announced the launch of a new mapping collaboration, the Overture Maps Foundation. Its stated mission is "powering current and next-generation map products by creating reliable, easy-to-use, and interoperable open map data." Overture founding members were Amazon Web Services (AWS), Meta, Microsoft and TomTom. Overture is to be complementary to the crowdsourced OpenStreetMap (OSM) project and the foundation encourages members to contribute data directly to OSM.

PNDA 
PNDA (Platform for Network Data Analytics) is a platform for scalable network analytics, rounding up data from "multiple sources on a network and works with Apache Spark to crunch the numbers in order to find useful patterns in the data more effectively."

R Consortium 
The R Consortium is dedicated to expanding the use of R language and developing it further. R Consortium works with the R Foundation and other organizations working to broaden the reach of the language. The consortium is supported by a collection of tech industry heavyweights including Microsoft, IBM, Oracle, Google, and Esri.

Real-Time Linux 

Real-Time Linux has an overall goal of encouraging widespread adoption of Real Time. It was formed to coordinate efforts to mainline PREEMPT_RT and assist maintainers in "continuing development work, long-term support and future research of RT." Before 2004 there were research projects but no serious attempt at merging with mainline kernel. In 2004 Ingo Molnar started work on a patchset joined by Thomas Gleixner, who was working with Douglas Niehaus, and Steven Rostedt along with others. The patchset has seen rewriting and configuration has been merged into mainline kernel.

Project is aimed at deterministic RTOS with work involving threaded interrupts and priority inheritance. There is a wide range of requirements and use cases for RTOS and while project aims at large amounts of them it is not aiming for the most narrow and specialized range of cases.

Unrelated work is done by FSMLabs for RTLinux.

RethinkDB 

After RethinkDB announced its shutdown as a business, the Linux Foundation announced that it had purchased the intellectual property under its Cloud Native Computing Foundation project, which was then relicensed under the Apache License (ASLv2). RethinkDB describes itself as "the first open-source, scalable JSON database built from the ground up for the realtime web."

RISC-V International 
The RISC-V International association is chartered to standardize and promote the open RISC-V instruction set architecture together with its hardware and software ecosystem for use in all computing devices.

seL4 
seL4 is the only microkernel in existence which has been developed using formal verification techniques. It belongs to the L4 microkernel family and was, like the other L4 microkernels, designed to attain great security and performance.

Servo 
Servo is a browser engine developed to take advantage of the memory safety properties and concurrency features of the Rust programming language. It was originally developed by Mozilla and later donated to the Linux Foundation.

SNAS.io 
Streaming Network Analytics System (project SNAS.io) is an open source framework to collect and track millions of routers, peers, prefixes (routing objects) in real time. SNAS.io is a Linux Foundation Project announced in May 2017.

Software Developer Diversity and Inclusion  
The Software Developer Diversity and Inclusion (SDDI) project aims to discover and promote best practices to increase diversity and inclusion in software engineering.

SPDX 

The Software Package Data Exchange (SPDX) project was started in 2010, to create a standard format for communicating the components, licenses and copyrights associated with software packages. As part of the project, there is a team that curates the SPDX License List, which defines a list of identifiers for commonly found licenses and exceptions used for open source and other collaborative software.

Tizen 

Tizen is a free and open-source, standards-based software platform supported by leading mobile operators, device manufacturers, and silicon suppliers for multiple device categories such as smartphones, tablets, netbooks, in-vehicle infotainment devices, and smart TVs.

TODO 
TODO (Talk Openly, Develop Openly) is an open source collective housed under the Linux Foundation. It helps companies interested in open source collaborate better and more efficiently. TODO aims to reach companies and organizations that want to turn out the best open source projects and programs. "The TODO Group reaches across industries to collaborate with open source technical and business leaders to share best practices, tools and programs for building dependable, effective projects for the long term," said Jim Zemlin at Collaboration Summit 2016.

Trust Over IP 
The Trust Over IP Foundation was launched in May 2020 and is hosted by the Linux Foundation under its Join Development Foundation legal structure. The Trust Over IP Foundation began because of the digital identity, verifiable credentials, blockchain technology, and secure communications spaces and the visualization to create an architecture for decentralized digital trust. They are working on global standards for digital trust including digital wallets and digital signatures.

Xen Project 

The Xen Project team is a global open source community that develops the Xen Hypervisor, contributes to the Linux PVOPS framework, the Xen® Cloud Platform, and Xen® ARM.

Yocto Project 

The Yocto Project is an open source collaboration project that provides templates, tools and methods to help create custom Linux-based systems for embedded products regardless of the hardware architecture. It was founded in 2010 as a collaboration among many hardware manufacturers, open-source operating systems vendors, and electronics companies to bring some order to the chaos of embedded Linux development.

Zephyr Project 

Zephyr is a small real-time operating system for connected, resource-constrained devices supporting multiple architectures. It is developed as an open source collaboration project and released under the Apache License 2.0. Zephyr became a project of the Linux Foundation in February 2016.

Community stewardship 
For the Linux kernel community, the Linux Foundation hosts its IT infrastructure and organizes conferences such as the Linux Kernel Summit and Linux Plumbers Conference. It also hosts a Technical Advisory Board made up of Linux kernel developers. One of these developers is appointed to sit on the Linux Foundation board.

Goodwill partnership 
In January 2016, the Linux Foundation announced a partnership with Goodwill Central Texas to help hundreds of disadvantaged individuals from underserved communities and a variety of backgrounds get the training they need to start new and lucrative careers in Linux IT.

Community Developer Travel Fund 
To fund deserving developers to accelerate technical problem solving and collaboration in the open source community, the Linux Foundation launched the Community Developer Travel Fund. Sponsorships are open to elite community developers with a proven track record of open source development achievement who cannot get funding to attend technical events from employers.

Community Specification 
In July 2020, the Linux Foundation announced an initiative allowing open source communities to create Open Standards using tools and methods inspired by open source developers.

Core Infrastructure Initiative 
The Core Infrastructure Initiative (CII), a project managed by the Linux Foundation that enables technology companies, industry stakeholders and esteemed developers to collaboratively identify and fund critical open source projects in need of assistance. In June 2015, the organization announced financial support of nearly $500,000 for three new projects to better support critical security elements of the global information infrastructure. In May 2016, CII launched its Best Practice Badge program to raise awareness of development processes and project governance steps that will help projects have better security outcomes. In May 2017, CII issued its 100th badge to a passing project.

Open Compliance Program 
The Linux Foundation's Open Compliance Program provides an array of programs for open source software compliance. The focus in this initiative is to educate and assist developers (and their companies) on license requirements in order to build programs without friction. The program consists primarily of self-administered training modules, but it is also meant to include automated tools to help programmatically identify license compliance issues.

Members 
As of June 2022, there are over 1,000 members who identify with the ideals and mission of the Linux Foundation and its projects.

Corporate members

Affiliates 
 Blockchain at Columbia
 Clemson University
 Indiana University
 Fondazione Inuit
 ISA
 Konkuk University
 NXT
 Seneca College
 Trace Research and Development Center at University of Maryland, College Park
 Turbot
 University of Rome Tor Vergata
 University of Wisconsin–Madison
 Zhejiang University

Funding 
Funding for the Linux Foundation comes primarily from its Platinum Members, who pay US$500,000 per year according to Schedule A in LF's bylaws, adding up to US$4 million. The Gold Members contribute a combined total of US$1.6 million, and smaller members less again.

As of April 2014, the foundation collected annual fees worth at least US$6,245,000.

Use of donations 

Before early 2018, the Linux Foundation's website stated that it "uses [donations] in part to help fund the infrastructure and fellows (like Linus Torvalds) who help develop the Linux kernel."

Events 
The Linux Foundation events are where the creators, maintainers, and practitioners of the most important open source projects meet. Linux Foundation events in 2017, for example, were expected to attract nearly 25,000 developers, maintainers, system administrators, thought leaders, business executives and other industry professionals from more than 4,000 organizations across 85 countries. Many open source projects also co-locate their events at the Linux Foundation events to take advantage of the cross-community collaboration with projects in the same industry.

2017 events covered various trends in open source, including big data, cloud native, containers, IoT, networking, security, and more.

Linux Foundation events are covered by a comprehensive code of conduct prohibiting inappropriate behavior, including harassment and offensive language. This applies at all times, either before, during or after the event, not only in person but also on social media and any other form of electronic communication. Persons witnessing such behavior are encouraged to report it to conference staff immediately and offenders may face penalties up to and including a lifetime ban from all future events. Additionally, to further improve diversity at events, all-male panels or speaker line-ups are specifically disallowed.

Due to the COVID-19 pandemic, the Linux Foundation has transitioned their events to a digital model until the virus has been successfully managed. The Foundation's largest event, Open Source Summit, was held remotely from June 29 to July 2, 2020 — it had originally been planned to take place in Austin, Texas.

References

External links